Françoise Hardy canta per voi in italiano is the only Italian-language studio album released into Italy of French popular singer Françoise Hardy. This album was released in November 1963 under label Disques Vogue. The first compact disc appeared in January 2013.

Two album covers 
 First: Marcel Hendrix orchestra is not credited to the back cover and the 2nd album is announced in preparation without revealing the picture sleeve 
 Second: Marcel Hendrix orchestra is credited to the back cover and the 2nd album released; the picture sleeve was added

Track listing
Nota bene: The list of songs printed on the back cover does not match the contents of the disc, but the one printed on the labels of the disc is correct.

Orchestras: Ezio Leoni (A1, A2, A3, A5, B2, B3, B4) - Marcel Hendrix (A4, B1, B5)

Reissue on CD into United Kingdom 

CD (jewel case) released in January 2013 with cover's replica of first album released into UK in 1964. Contains 12 songs in French language of this album + 10 songs from Françoise Hardy canta per voi in italiano, where the titles are in the same order as engraved on the original disk.

Track listing
In the same order as in the first edition of 1963 (see above).

Reissues on LP and CD into Italy 

LP released in February 2013 with the second cover's replica of Françoise Hardy canta per voi in italiano. Contains 10 songs in the order written on the back of the 1963 cover.
CD (card sleeve) released in February 2014 with the second cover's replica of  Françoise Hardy canta per voi in italiano. Contains 10 songs in the order written on the back of the 1963 cover + 12 bonus tracks, only realised on singles of 1963 to 1967.

Track listing
Orchestras: Ezio Leoni (A1, A4, B6, B7, B8, B9, B10) - Marcel Hendrix (A2, A3, A5)

Bonus - track listing 
Orchestras: Marcel Hendrix (11) - Ezio Leoni (12, 13) - Charles Blackwell (14, 15, 17, 18, 19, 20, 21, 22)

Notes and references

Françoise Hardy albums
1963 albums
Italian-language albums
Disques Vogue albums